Carolus is the medieval Latin form of the name Charles, notably the name of Charlemagne (742–814).

The given name also gave rise to a surname in the 17th century.

People

First name or title

 Carolus Andriamatsinoro (born 1989), Malagasy footballer
 Carolus Arretinus or Carlo Marsuppini (1399–1453), Italian humanist and chancellor 
 Carolus Clusius (Charles de l'Écluse), Flemish doctor and botanist
 Carolus de Tilly (1642–1698), French Roman Catholic prelate
 Carolus-Duran (Charles Auguste Émile Durand), French painter
 Carolus Fernández de Velasco (1596-1665) Belgian Roman Catholic clergy
 Carolus Antonius Fodor or Carel Anton Fodor (1768 – 1846), Dutch composer
 Carolus Gallus (1530 – 1616), Dutch minister and polemicist
 Carolus Hacquart (c. 1640 - after 1686), Flemish composer
 Carolus Magnus Hutschenreuther (1794 – 1845), German industrialist
 Carolus Adrianus Johannes Kreutz (born 1954), Dutch orchidologist, botanical writer and taxonomist
 Carolus Lassila (1922 – 1987), Finnish diplomat
 Carolus Luython (1557 – 1620), Belgian composer
 Carolus Linnaeus (Carl Linnaeus or Carl von Linné), Swedish botanist and physician
 Carolus Linnaeus the Younger (Carl Linnaeus the Younger), Swedish naturalist
 Carolus Luython, 17th-century composer
 Carolus Magnus (Charlemagne), Holy Roman Emperor
 Carolus Maneken (1419-1493), professor
 Carolus Mulerius (1601 – 1638), Dutch Hispanist and grammarian
 Carolus Niellius (1576 – 1652), Dutch Remonstrant minister
 Carolus Nolet (born 1940/41), Dutch businessman
 Carolus Polodig (1671–1714), Czech Roman Catholic prelate
 Carolus Johannes Reinecke (born 1941), South African rector
 Carolus Rex (Charles XII of Sweden), King of Sweden
 Carolus Sigonius (c. 1524 – 1584), Italian humanist
 Carolus Souliaert (died 1540), 16th-century composer
 Carolus Stoffels (1893 – 1957), Dutch modern pentathlete
 Carolus Wimmer (born 1948), German politician
 Carolus Wrede (1860 — 1927), Finnish industrialist

Middle name
 Christianus Carolus Henricus van der Aa (1718 – 1793), Dutch Lutheran pastor
 Francis Carolus Eeles (1876 – 1954), English liturgical scholar and ecclesiastical historian

Surname
 Cheryl Carolus, South African politician
 Jean Carolus, 19th-century Belgian artist
 Johann Carolus, 17th-century newspaper publisher
 Joris Carolus, 17th-century Dutch cartographer
 Louis Carolus-Barré (1910 – 1993), French librarian and medievalist

Masculine given names
French masculine given names
German masculine given names
Dutch masculine given names